Antoine-Joseph "Adolphe" Sax (6 November 1814 –  7 February 1894) was a Belgian inventor and musician who invented the saxophone in the early 1840s, patenting it in 1846. He also invented the saxotromba, saxhorn and saxtuba. He played the flute and clarinet.

Early life
Antoine-Joseph Sax was born on 6 November 1814 in Dinant, in what is now Belgium, to Charles-Joseph Sax and his wife Marie-Joseph (Masson). While his given name was Antoine-Joseph, he was referred to as Adolphe from childhood. His father and mother were instrument designers themselves, who made several changes to the design of the French horn. Adolphe began to make his own instruments at an early age, entering two of his flutes and a clarinet into a competition at the age of 15. He subsequently studied performance on those two instruments as well as voice at the Royal Conservatory of Brussels. 

Sax faced many brushes with death. As a child, he once fell from a height of three floors, hit his head on a stone and was believed dead. At the age of three, he drank a bowl full of acidic water, mistaking it for milk, and later swallowed a pin. He received serious burns from a gunpowder explosion and once fell onto a hot cast-iron frying pan, burning his side.
Several times he avoided accidental poisoning and asphyxiation from sleeping in a room where varnished furniture was drying. Another time young Sax was struck on the head by a cobblestone and fell into a river, almost dying.

His mother once said that "he's a child condemned to misfortune; he won't live". His neighbors called him "little Sax, the ghost".

Career and later life
After leaving the Royal Conservatory of Brussels, Sax began to experiment with new instrument designs, while his parents continued their business of making conventional instruments. Sax's first important invention was an improvement in bass clarinet design, which he patented at the age of 24. He relocated permanently to Paris in 1842 and began working on a new set of valved bugles. While he did not invent this instrument, his examples were much more successful than those of his rivals and became known as saxhorns. Hector Berlioz was so enamoured of these that he arranged in February 1844 for one of his pieces to be played entirely on saxhorns. They were made in seven different sizes and paved the way for the creation of the flugelhorn. Today saxhorns are sometimes used in concert bands, marching bands, and orchestras. The saxhorn also laid the groundwork for the modern euphonium.

Sax also developed the saxotromba family, valved brass instruments with narrower bore than the saxhorns, in 1845, though they survived only briefly.

The use of saxhorns spread rapidly. The saxhorn valves were accepted as state-of-the-art in their time and remain largely unchanged today. The advances made by Adolphe Sax were soon followed by the British brass band movement, which exclusively adopted the saxhorn family of instruments. A decade after saxhorns became available, the Jedforest Instrumental Band (1854) and The Hawick Saxhorn Band (1855) were formed in the Scottish Borders.

On 28 June 1846 he patented the saxophone, intended for use in orchestras and military bands. By 1846 Sax had designed saxophones ranging from sopranino to subcontrabass, although not all were built. Composer Hector Berlioz wrote approvingly of the new instrument in 1842, but despite his support, saxophones did not become a standard part of the orchestra. Their ability to play technical passages easily like woodwinds yet project loudly like brass instruments led to their inclusion in military bands in France and elsewhere. Sax's reputation helped secure him a job teaching at the Paris Conservatory in 1857.

He continued to make instruments later in life and presided over the new saxophone course at the Paris Conservatory. Legal troubles involving patents continued for over 20 years, with rival instrument makers attacking the legitimacy of his patents and Sax suing them for patent infringement. He was driven into bankruptcy three times: in 1852, 1873 and 1877.

Sax suffered from lip cancer between 1853 and 1858 but made a full recovery. In 1894 he died of pneumonia in Paris, in poverty, and was interred in section 5 (Avenue de Montebello) at the Cimetière de Montmartre in Paris.

Honors and awards 
In his birthplace Dinant in Belgium the Mr Sax's House is dedicated to his life and saxophones.
 1849: Awarded the Chevalier rank of the Legion of Honour.
 1867:  at the 1867 Paris International Exposition.
 1995: In 1995, his likeness was featured on the front of Belgium's 200 Belgian francs banknote.
 2015: Google Doodle commemorated his 201st birthday.

Notes

References

Bibliography

External links 

 Pictures of saxophones made by Adolphe and Adolphe Edouard Sax
 
 

1814 births
1894 deaths
19th-century Belgian inventors
Belgian musical instrument makers
Belgian saxophonists
Burials at Montmartre Cemetery
Academic staff of the Conservatoire de Paris
Inventors of musical instruments
People from Dinant